The New Orleans Greys were a Military volunteer unit of two militia companies that totaled about 120 men that had formed in the city of that name for service in the Texas War of Independence. Their name came from the grey military fatigues they wore.

Companies formed
The New Orleans Greys were organized in New Orleans on October 13, 1835, at the Coffee house and Arcade of Thomas Banks. Adolphus Sterne, a Nacogdoches businessman, favored the Texas Revolution and with approval from the Consultation, the Texas provisional government, financed the operation.

The New Orleans Greys were composed of two companies. One company of 54 men served under Captain Thomas H. Breece and the other company of 68 men under Captain Robert C. Morris, as well as several companies of Texians who had arrived recently, were eager to face the Mexican Army directly.

Texas War of Independence
Twenty-three Greys fought and died at the Battle of the Alamo, one died at the Siege of Béxar, twenty-one were lost in the Goliad Campaign, and seven Greys served at the Battle of San Jacinto.

According to Thomas Ricks Lindley's research, up to 50 of Fannin's men, most of whom primarily had been in Thomas H. Breece's company of New Orleans Greys, left Fannin's command in Goliad to go to the rescue of their former associates at the Alamo.  Lindley believes that on March 3 these men must have joined with the Alamo advance relief company under John Chenoweth and Francis L. DeSauque, as well as with Juan Seguin and his Tejano company. That afternoon, the entire group joined with the Gonzales relief unit waiting at the Cibolo Creek,  from the Alamo.

Uniforms and weapons
Unlike the majority of the Texian Army volunteers, the New Orleans Greys looked like soldiers, with some uniforms, well-maintained rifles, US-pattern muskets, adequate ammunition, and some semblance of discipline.
The Greys had brought an extra special piece of equipment along with them; a 18-pounder cannon. The 18-pounder had arrived at Velasco with the New Orleans Greys aboard the schooner Columbus. It had been left behind when the Greys realized that they had forgotten to bring any cannonballs for their oversized artillery. A special convoy was sent by Philip Dimmitt, commander of Fort LaBahia to retrieve the cannon. A party of 20 men were tasked with the mission to haul the 18-pounder cannon from Dimmitt's Landing to San Antonio, to use during the siege of Bexar. They were soon joined by others, including twenty members of the Greys, until the group totaled 75 men. They struggled with the giant cannon for about 200 miles, pushing and pulling, until they finally rolled in to San Antonio. They arrived two days after the battle, when General Cos had already surrendered. But all their work was not in vain; the cannon would earn a special place in the Alamo compound when it was used in the Battle of the Alamo

References

Brown, Gary.  Volunteers in the Texas Revolution: The New Orleans Greys.  Lanham, MD:  Taylor Trade Publishing, 2004.

Miller, Edward, New Orleans and the Texas Revolution. College Station: Texas A&M University Press, 2004.

External links
New Orleans Greys at The Handbook of Texas

Edward L. Miller, New Orleans and the Texas Revolution (College Station: Texas A&M University Press, 2004)

Texas Revolution
Alamo defenders